The 1983–84 National Football League was the 53rd staging of the National Football League (NFL), an annual Gaelic football tournament for the Gaelic Athletic Association county teams of Ireland.

Kerry defeated Galway in the final, Mikey Sheehy scoring 1-5.

Format 
Four divisions of 8 teams: each team plays all the other teams in its division once, earning 2 points for a win and 1 for a draw. Tie-breakers are played to separate teams (if necessary for promotion, relegation or knockout places).

The top two teams in Divisions 2, 3 and 4 are promoted. The bottom two teams in Divisions 1, 2 and 3 are relegated.

The NFL title is awarded after a knockout stage. Eight teams progress to the quarter-finals:
Teams placed 1st, 2nd, 3rd and 4th in Division 1
Teams placed 1st and 2nd in Division 2
Teams placed 1st in Division 3 and 4

Results

Division One

Play-Off

Table

Division Two

Play-Off

Table

Division Three

Table

Division Four

Table

Knockout Phase

Quarter-finals

Semi-finals

Finals

References

External links

National Football League
National Football League
National Football League (Ireland) seasons